Tom Patti is an American businessman and politician who is a member of the San Joaquin County Board of Supervisors. As an amateur boxer, Patti was training partners with Mike Tyson. After the death of Cus D'Amato, Patti became Tyson's manager and coach. He was a Republican candidate in the 2022 election in California's 9th congressional district.

Biography
Born 1963 in New York, Patti moved to Stockton, California. After graduating from high school, he attended Delta College where in 2015 he became a member of the Delta College Foundation board, a non-profit organization with the purpose of creating opportunities for local students to get an expanded education.

Beginning in 1982, Patti, along with Mike Tyson, was mentored by boxing manager-trainer Cus D'Amato. In 2001, Patti returned to California.

On November 8, 2016, Patti became the County Supervisor of District 3 in San Joaquin County.

Patti owns Delta Cranes in Stockton, California.

Patti is a member of the Child Abuse Prevention Council.

In 2017, Patti, together with Oleg Maltsev, wrote the book Non-compromised Pendulum about the style of Cus D'Amato. Patti said the book was a tribute to the memory of D'Amato.

2022 U.S. House campaign
In 2022, Patti entered the race for U.S. Congress in California's 9th congressional district. He advanced from the top two primary in June 2022 and faced incumbent Democrat Josh Harder in the November general election. Harder defeated Patti.

References

1962 births
21st-century American businesspeople
American male boxers
American male writers
California local politicians
Candidates in the 2022 United States House of Representatives elections
Living people
Mike Tyson